Samuel Earle (November 28, 1760November 24, 1833) was a United States representative from South Carolina. Born in Frederick County in the Colony of Virginia, he moved to the Province of South Carolina in 1774; he participated in the American Revolutionary War, entering the service as an ensign in the 5th South Carolina Regiment in 1777 and leaving as captain of a company of rangers in 1782. He was a member of the South Carolina House of Representatives from 1784 to 1788, and was a delegate to the State convention that ratified the U.S. Constitution on May 12, 1788; he was a delegate to the South Carolina Constitutional Convention in 1790.

Earle was elected as a Republican to the Fourth Congress, serving from March 4, 1795 to March 3, 1797. He died in Pendleton District, South Carolina, on November 24, 1833, four days shy of his 73rd birthday; interment was in Beaverdam Cemetery, Oconee County, South Carolina.

Elias Earle, Samuel's uncle, and John Baylis Earle, his cousin, were also U.S. Representatives from South Carolina.

External links

1760 births
1833 deaths
Burials in South Carolina
Continental Army officers from South Carolina
Members of the South Carolina House of Representatives
People from Frederick County, Virginia
People from South Carolina
Democratic-Republican Party members of the United States House of Representatives from South Carolina